Sandra Wasserman (born 10 March 1970) is a former professional tennis player from Antwerp, Belgium.

Fed Cup
Wasserman became Belgium's youngest Fed Cup player when she lost to Csilla Bartos of Hungary in October 1985 in Japan. She also lost the longest tie-break played by the Belgian Fed Cup team, losing 13–11 to Jennifer Capriati of the United States in 1990 in Atlanta, Georgia after losing the first set 6–0.

Results
Wasserman won her only doubles title at the Spanish Open in Barcelona, Spain on 25 April 1988, partnering Iva Budařová and beating Anna-Karin Olsson and María José Llorca in the final in three sets.

She reached the finals of the singles event at the Clarins Open in Paris, France during its first two years. In 1988, she lost to Sabrina Goleš, and in 1989, she was defeated by Petra Langrová.

Her five 3rd round defeats in Grand Slam tournaments were:
 Australian Open 1990 lost to Dianne Van Rensburg
 French Open 1987 lost to Manuela Maleeva and 1992 lost to Nathalie Tauziat after qualifying both times
 US Open 1988 lost to Katerina Maleeva and 1989 lost to Arantxa Sánchez Vicario

WTA Tour finals

Singles (0–2)

Doubles (1–0)

ITF Circuit finals

Singles (0–2)

Grand Slam singles tournament timeline

References

External links
 
 
 

1970 births
Living people
Belgian female tennis players
Flemish sportspeople
Sportspeople from Antwerp
20th-century Belgian women